Victoria Ellen Cabello (born 12 March 1975, in London) is an Italian television presenter.

She was born in London to an Italian father and an English mother, and grew up in Valsolda, a small town in the province of Como, just a few kilometers from Switzerland.

Cabello started her television career in 1997 as one of MTV Italy's original VJs, where she hosted Select MTV from London. She also appeared on Italia 1's Le Iene (the Italian version of Caiga quien caiga) where she performed comic interviews with famous Italian and international celebrities. Between 2005 and 2008, Cabello hosted the talk show Very Victoria on MTV Italy. In 2006, she hosted the 56th Sanremo Music Festival with Giorgio Panariello and Ilary Blasi. In 2009, she moved from MTV Italy to La7, where she hosted the talk show Victor Victoria - Niente è come sembra.

From September 2011 to May 2013, she hosted a show about football Quelli che... il Calcio on Rai 2.

In September 2013, she replaced Simona Ventura as judge on the eighth season of the Italian version of X Factor alongside Fedez, Morgan, and Mika.

References

1975 births
Living people
Television personalities from London
Italian television personalities
Italian people of English descent